Shuaib, Shoaib, Shuayb or Shuʿayb (meaning: "who shows the right path") is an ancient Midianite Nabi (Prophet) in Islam, and the most revered prophet in the Druze faith. Shuayb is traditionally identified with the Biblical Jethro, Moses' father-in-law. Shuaib is mentioned in the Quran a total of 11 times. He is believed to have lived after Ibrahim (Abraham), and Muslims believe that he was sent as a prophet to a community: the Midianites, who are also known as the Aṣḥāb al-Aykah ("Companions of the Wood"), since they used to worship a large tree. To the people, Shuaib proclaimed the straight path and warned the people to end their fraudulent ways. When the community did not repent, Allāh (God) destroyed the community. 

Alongside Hud, Saleh and Muhammad, Shuaib is understood by Muslims as one of the four Arabian prophets sent by God. It is said that he was known by Muslims as "the eloquent preacher amongst the prophets", because he was, according to tradition, granted talent and eloquence in his language. 

The Druze revere Shuaib as an important figure in their faith, and hold an annual pilgrimage to Nabi Shu'ayb, the purported location of his tomb, in the Lower Galilee.

Historical context
The area to which Shuʿayb was sent to is named 'Madyan in the Qur'an, known in English as Midian, which is frequently referred to in the Bible. The Midianites were said to be of Arab descent, though being neighbors of the Biblical Canaanites, they intermixed with them. It is said they were a wandering tribe, and that their principal territory at the time of Musa (Moses) was the Sinai Peninsula.

Disputed identification with Jethro 
Jethro is mentioned in the Bible (Exodus 3:1) as the father in law of Moses. Although Shuaib is frequently identified with the Midianite priest Jethro, most modern scholars reject this identification. Classical commentators, such as Ibn Kathir, say Shuʿayb was a great-grandson of Abraham: Shuʿayb is believed to have been the son of Mikil, son of Midian, son of Abraham. That would render impossible the identification with Jethro, who lived at the time of Moses, purportedly hundreds of years after Abraham.

Prophecy in Midian 

The Qur'an states that Shuaib was appointed by God to be a prophet to the people of Midian. The people of this land were said to be especially notorious for cheating others through dishonesty and for idolatry. Shuʿayb's prophecy mainly involved calling the Midianites to the correct path of God, and forbidding them to worship false gods.

It is also said he told his people to stop being dishonest in their daily activities. Although he preached and prophesied for a sustained period of time, the majority of the people refused to listen to him. Shuayb, however, remained steadfast. He consistently preached powerfully against the wicked, telling them of the punishment that had befallen the sinful before them. Shuʿayb warned the people that their ignorance would lead to the destruction of Midian, giving historical examples of earlier prophets, including Noah, Hud, Saleh and Lot, all of whose people had been destroyed by God.

The people taunted Shuʿayb and told him that, were it not for the prestigious family he came from, he would surely have been stoned to death. Shuayb replied, "Is my family of more consideration with you than God?" When the Midianites refused to believe, they were destroyed by a mighty earthquake. The Qur'an, however, mentions that Shuʿayb, and his believing companions, were rescued from the thunderous punishment.

Parallels with other prophets 
Shuayb's mission is often mentioned in the Qur'an with the mission of Noah, Hud, Saleh and Lot. Scholars have pointed out that these five prophets exemplify the early prophetic missions: The prophet would be sent to his community; the community would pay no attention to his warning and would instead threaten him with punishment; after years of preaching, God would ask him to leave his community, while his people were subsequently destroyed in a punishment. Scholars chronologically interpret the listing of the five prophets, so Shuʿayb was a descendant of Noah (preached about the Great Flood) and the Prophet Abraham.

Claimed burial places of Shuayb 

The Druze believe the tomb of Nabi Shu'ayb is located near Hittin, in the Lower Galilee. Each year, on the 25th of April, the Druze gather at the site to discuss community affairs.

There is also a tomb in the southwest of Iran (in the village Guriyeh, Shushtar) which has been recorded as the tomb of Shuayb.

See also 
 Biblical narratives and the Qur'an
 Jabal An-Nabi Shu'ayb
 Legends and the Qur'an
 Qiṣaṣ al-Anbiyāʾ ("Stories of the Prophets")

References 

Prophets of the Quran
Prophets in the Druze faith
Midian
Jethro (biblical figure)